Loreena Isobel Irene McKennitt,  (born February 17, 1957) is a Canadian singer-songwriter, multi-instrumentalist, and composer who writes, records, and performs world music with Celtic and Middle Eastern influences. McKennitt is known for her refined and clear soprano vocals. She has sold more than 14 million records worldwide.

Early life and education 
McKennitt was born in Morden, Manitoba, of Irish and Scottish descent to parents Jack (died 1992) and Irene McKennitt (1931–2011). In Morden, she developed her love for music, influenced, in part, by the musical traditions of the local Mennonite community.

McKennitt enrolled at the University of Manitoba in Winnipeg to become a veterinarian. While in Winnipeg she discovered folk music, including fellow Canadians Neil Young, Joni Mitchell, and Gordon Lightfoot. After performing at the inaugural Winnipeg Folk Festival in 1974, McKennitt developed an interest in Celtic music and visited Ireland to hear it for herself. Developing a passion for Celtic music, she learned to play the Celtic harp and began busking at various places, including St. Lawrence Market in Toronto to earn money to record her first album.

In 1981, she moved to Stratford, Ontario, to join the Stratford Festival acting company, and still resides there.

Career

Initial success: 1985–1998 
McKennitt's first album, Elemental, was released in 1985, followed by To Drive the Cold Winter Away (1987), Parallel Dreams (1989), The Visit (1991), The Mask and Mirror (1994), A Winter Garden (1995), and The Book of Secrets (1997). All of her work is released under her own label, Quinlan Road.

In 1990, McKennitt provided the music for the National Film Board of Canada documentary The Burning Times, a feminist revisionist account of the Early Modern European witchcraft trials. She and the musical team she headed would later re-record the documentary's main theme on her album The Visit under the title "Tango to Evora".

In 1993, she toured Europe supporting Mike Oldfield. In 1995, her version of the traditional Irish song "Bonny Portmore" was featured in the Highlander series, followed by the 1994 film Highlander 3: The Sorcerer. McKennitt's single "The Mummers' Dance" received airplay in North American markets during the spring of 1997, and was used as the theme song for the short-lived TV series Legacy. It also saw use in the trailer for a wide-release 1998 Drew Barrymore film Ever After.

Her music appeared in the movies The Santa Clause, Soldier. Jade, Holy Man, The Mists of Avalon, and Tinker Bell. It was also featured in the television series Roar, Due South, and Full Circle (Women and Spirituality).

Personal tragedy and hiatus 
In July 1998, McKennitt's fiancé Ronald Rees, his brother Richard, and their close friend Gregory Cook drowned in a boating accident on Georgian Bay. She was deeply affected by the event, and she founded the Cook-Rees Memorial Fund for Water Search and Safety in the same year. At the time of the incident, she was working on a live album of two performances called Live in Paris and Toronto. The proceeds from this album were donated to the newly created memorial fund, totalling some three million dollars.

After the release of the live album, McKennitt decided that she would substantially reduce the number of her public performances, and she did not release any new recordings until the studio album An Ancient Muse in 2006.

Return to music: 2006–present 
During 2005, McKennitt began work on the album that would become An Ancient Muse, her seventh full-length studio album, released in November 2006. In September 2006, she performed live at the Alhambra. The performance premiered on PBS and in August 2007 was released on a three-disc DVD/CD set titled Nights from the Alhambra.

In 2008, McKennitt wrote and composed a song she titled "To The Fairies They Draw Near" as the theme song for Disney's direct-to-video animated film Tinker Bell. She also provided the narration for the film.

In early 2008, she returned to Peter Gabriel's Real World Studios to record A Midwinter Night's Dream, an extended version of her 1995 mini-album A Winter Garden: Five Songs for the Season. The album was released on October 28, 2008.

Since the release of An Ancient Muse, McKennitt has toured consistently, with a European and North American An Ancient Muse tour in 2007 and another extensive tour across Canada and United States later in 2007, a tour of Europe in 2008 and a Mediterranean tour in 2009 with stops in Greece, Turkey, Cyprus, Lebanon, Hungary and Italy.

On September 17, 2009, McKennitt announced that she planned to release a two-disc album titled A Mediterranean Odyssey. The first CD, "From Istanbul to Athens", consisted of 10 new live recordings made during her 2009 Mediterranean tour, including songs she had never before recorded in concert. The second CD, "The Olive and the Cedar", had a Mediterranean theme which McKennitt herself curated. It contained previously released studio recordings created between 1994 and 2006.

November 16, 2010, saw the US release (November 12 for Europe) of McKennitt's latest studio album, The Wind That Shakes the Barley. Recorded at the Sharon Temple, Ontario, it consists of nine traditional Celtic songs. "Every once and again there is a pull to return to one's own roots or beginnings, with the perspective of time and experience, to feel the familiar things you once loved and love still", said McKennitt.

When McKennitt released The Wind that Shakes the Barley she visited several countries to help promote the album. During the promotional tour she performed an hour-long concert in the studios of German radio station SWR1, accompanied only by Brian Hughes (guitars) and Caroline Lavelle (cello) who have long been part of her tours and recordings. This live concert was released on CD in 2011. Called Troubadours on the Rhine, the album was nominated for a 2012 Grammy for Best New Age Album.

On November 30, 2012, McKennitt lent her support to Kate Winslet's Golden Hat Foundation together with Tim Janis, Sarah McLachlan, Andrea Corr, Hayley Westenra, the Sleepy Man Banjo Boys, Dawn Kenney, Jana Mashonee, Amy Petty, and a choir, along with others, performing on "The American Christmas Carol" concert at Carnegie Hall.

McKennitt's 10th studio album, Lost Souls, was released on May 11, 2018. She planned a tour to support the album's release in 2018 and 2019.

She had a small acting role in the 2018 film Road to the Lemon Grove, as the voice of God.

In 2019, McKennitt released the live album Live at the Royal Albert Hall, recorded earlier that year in London.

Legacy

Genre 

McKennitt's music has generally been classified as World or Celtic music even though it contains aspects and characteristics of music from around the globe and is sometimes classified as folk music in record stores.

McKennitt is occasionally compared to Enya, but McKennitt's music is more grounded in traditional and classical invocations, using literary works as sources of lyrics and springboards for interpretation such as "The Lady of Shalott" by Lord Tennyson, "Prospero's Speech" (the final soliloquy in William Shakespeare's The Tempest), the Northumbrian murder ballad "The Twa Sisters" (which inspired "The Bonny Swans" on The Mask and Mirror), "Snow" by Archibald Lampman, "Dark Night of the Soul" by St. John of the Cross, Dante's Inferno, William Blake's "Lullaby", Yeats' "The Stolen Child," "The English Ladye and the Knight" by Sir Walter Scott, and "The Highwayman" by Alfred Noyes.

Influences 
Before McKennitt composes any music, she engages in considerable research on a specific subject which then forms the general concept of the album. Before creating Elemental and Parallel Dreams, she travelled to Ireland for inspiration from the country's history, folklore, geography and culture. The album The Mask and Mirror was preceded by research in Spain where she studied Galicia, a Celtic section of Spain, along with its abundant Arabic roots. The result was an album that included elements of Celtic and Arabic music. According to the jacket notes, her album An Ancient Muse was inspired by travels among and reading about the various cultures along the Silk Road.

Documentaries 
Late in the 1990s, McKennitt created No Journey's End, a half-hour documentary, for American television in which she discussed the influences behind her music. No Journey's End contained excerpts from several songs from the albums Parallel Dreams, The Visit, and The Mask and Mirror It also shows live performances of the songs "The Lady of Shalott", "Santiago", and "The Dark Night of the Soul". It was later released on DVD and VHS, the former also containing music videos for "The Mummers' Dance" and "The Bonny Swans." A bonus copy of the DVD was included with the 2004 remastered versions of McKennitt's CDs.

In 2008, McKennitt released A Moveable Musical Feast, based on her 2007 An Ancient Muse tour. The DVD included interviews with McKennitt, her band, crew, fans and professional colleagues from the Canadian music industry.

Court case 

In 2005, McKennitt was involved in an acrimonious court case in England when her former friend and employee, Niema Ash, published a book, Travels with Loreena McKennitt: My Life as a Friend, that contained intimate details of their friendship. McKennitt argued that much of the book contained confidential personal information that Ash had no right to publish. The English courts found that there had indeed been a breach of confidence and a misuse of McKennitt's private information, and the case set important precedents in the law of England and Wales on the privacy of public figures. The House of Lords affirmed the lower court's decisions in 2007.

Honours 
Juno Award, Best Roots/Traditional Album 1992, for The Visit
Juno Award, Best Roots/Traditional Album 1994, for The Mask and Mirror
Billboard Music Award for International Achievement, 1997
Honorary Doctor of Letters, Wilfrid Laurier University, 2002
Honorary Doctor of Laws, University of Manitoba, June 2005
Canadian Ambassador, Hans Christian Andersen Bicentenary, June 2005
Honorary Doctor of Laws, Queen's University, October 2005
Investiture as Honorary Colonel, 435 Transport and Rescue Squadron, Royal Canadian Air Force, December 2006
Nominated for a Grammy award, Best Contemporary World Music Album, in 2007
Western Canadian Music Awards Lifetime Achievement Award, September 2009
Performed at Vancouver 2010 Winter Olympics, Opening Ceremonies, February 12, 2010
Honorary Bachelor of Applied Business, George Brown College, June 2010
Nominated for a Grammy award, Best New Age Album, in 2012
Appointment as Honorary Colonel of the Royal Canadian Air Force, September 2014

Awards and decorations 
McKennitt's personal awards and decorations include the following:

Quinlan Road 

Quinlan Road is an independent record label founded in 1985 and based in Stratford, Ontario, Canada.  It is owned and operated by its sole artist, Loreena McKennitt. Quinlan Road started out at McKennitt's home where she sold recordings by mail order. Today Quinlan Road music is distributed internationally by Verve Records, Universal Music Group, Keltia Musique, and SPV GmbH.

Discography

Studio albums

Live albums

EPs

Compilations

Boxed sets

Singles

Videos 
The Mummers' Dance (1997)
The Bonny Swans
Nights from the Alhambra (2007, live concert in Spain premiered on PBS)
A Moveable Musical Feast (2008, a tour documentary from Loreena's 2007 North American Tour)

Other 
No Journey's End (half-hour profile, aired on PBS; DVD)
Heaven on Earth (TV movie 1987 – played "Lady Traveler")
Highlander III: The Sorcerer (Soundtrack contribution)
The Santa Clause (Soundtrack contribution, "The Bells of Christmas")
Léolo (Soundtrack contribution)
Una casa con vista al mar (Soundtrack contribution)
The Mists of Avalon (Soundtrack use)
The Burning Times (Soundtrack contribution)
Due South (Soundtrack use)
Northern Exposure (Soundtrack use)
Tinker Bell (Direct-to-DVD movie, 2008 – Narrator)
Soldier (Soundtrack use)

See also 
Eileen McGann – fellow Irish-Canadian female Celtic folksinger. During McKennitt's early career McGann played many of the same venues, and they appeared together on several early compilation recordings.
List of ambient music artists

References

External links 

Loreena McKennitt interview from the Echoes public radio show
 
 https://open.spotify.com/episode/1P8O1f3bC8naS9eSfkUL2e?si=1fa2e06a2f52451f  Loreena McKennitt interview on the Chris Scott Show FM105 Down Community Radio, Northern Ireland

1957 births
Canadian folk musicians
Canadian harpists
Canadian keyboardists
Canadian women pianists
Canadian singer-songwriters
Canadian sopranos
Celtic fusion musicians
Fast Folk artists
Musicians from Ontario
Canadian people of Irish descent
Canadian people of Scottish descent
Living people
Members of the Order of Canada
Members of the Order of Manitoba
People from Morden, Manitoba
Verve Records artists
Warner Records artists
20th-century Canadian women singers
21st-century Canadian women singers
21st-century Canadian pianists
Canadian women record producers
20th-century women pianists
21st-century women pianists